TRU Simulation + Training (TRU, usually pronounced as in "true") is a Canadian-American manufacturer of flight simulators and training devices for civil and military markets. It is a subsidiary of Textron and was formed in 2014 when previously acquired simulator manufacturers Mechtronix and OPNICUS were merged with part of Textron Systems division. A further company, business jet training provider ProFlight, was acquired and merged later that year.

In 2014, TRU was selected by Boeing for the development and supply of a 737 MAX full flight training suite, and two years later the company secured a 10-year agreement for a similar product for the newly developed 777X.

In November 2020, the non-US based (Quebec based) civil aviation business (previously Mechtronix sites) were sold to CAE  after Textron announced shutting down this section of its TRU Simulation business in July of the same year.  With the purchase of CAE continued its expansion in the simulator business during a difficult economic time for airlines and the industry purchasing the assets of TRU after Textron invests more than $100M to enter the business [8].

References

External links 

Textron
Companies based in South Carolina